Leucinodes raondry is a species of moth in the family Crambidae. It is found in Madagascar. The species was first described by Pierre Viette in 1981.

References

Spilomelinae
Moths described in 1981